Sinergia (Synergy) is the self-titled debut studio album released by Chilean rock band Sinergia, independently in 2001 consisting of 12 tracks; by Sello Azul label in 2002 consisting of 13 tracks and by La Oreja label in 2003 consisting of 14 tracks and 3 music videos for the singles "Chilerobot", "Concurso" and "Mujer Robusta". The album was produced by Andrés Godoy, father of the band's drummer Bruno "Brunanza" Godoy.

The songs "Chupatrón" and "Santiago U.S.A." are originally from their demo album "Apoyando La Demencia", this time with an intro song for "Chupatrón".

The music video for the single "Mujer Robusta" reached the number one position in the ranking "Los 10 + Pedidos" (The 10 Most Requested Videos) of the South American MTV channel, and the song "Marina" is a "pajaron hymn", which is mainly the spirit of the band and his fans (who are called "pajarones"), the song's about how a young guy falls madly in love with a girl called Marina and thinks that studying is the best way to get her attention but that doesn't help him at all in getting the courage to talk to her and tell her how he feels.

The songs "Mujer Robusta", "Amor Alternativo", "Marina", "Concurso", "Chupatrón" and "Chilerobot" are in the recently released 22 Éxitos Pajarones, a compilation album celebrating the band's 22nd anniversary

The album has 4 editions, the first edition of the album, where "'Mujer Robusta" does not appear,   It didn't get many editions. The second, It's from "Sello Azul", with "Mujer Robusta", as a bonus track, releasing many more editions. The Third, has all the songs, so it is the definitive edition of the disc. The fourth is the commemorative edition of the album (20 Years) has 2 more bonus tracks, "Liquidación" and "Le Tengo Miedo A Todo".

Track listing 

 In the 2003's edition the music videos of Mujer Robusta, Concurso and Chilerobot can only be found by introducing the CD to a computer, where can be found in a folder.

Credits and personnel 
Credits taken from Sinergia's (2003 edition) liner notes.

 Rodrigo Osorio - composer, vocals
 Alexis González - composer, bass guitar
 Pedro López - composer, guitar
 Bruno Godoy - composer, drums
 Paul Eberhard - composer, turntables
 Andrés Godoy - producer
 Walter Romero - recording engineer, mixing
 Miguel Foulon - recording engineer
 Miguel Bahamondes - mastering
 Ximena Montenegro - recording and mixing assistant
 Joaquin García - re-mastering
 Ramón Lorca - samples post-edition
 Alvaro Hoppe - collage, cover and back cover photography
 Anita Flores - photography
 Jorge Guajardo - photography
 Jaime Muñoz - photography
 Don Lalo - photography
 Sobras Producciones - photography, music videos' producers
 Piero Medone - cover art and Sinergia's logo designer
 José Salinas - art designer
 Johnny Cuent - composer
 Luis Silva - composer
 Julio Ortega - composer
 Eduardo Bertrán - music videos' director
 Nicolás López - music videos' director

Notes

References

Sinergia albums
2001 debut albums